Neslişah Sultan, later Neslişah Osmanoğlu (2 February 1921 – 2 April 2012) was an Ottoman princess, the paternal granddaughter of the last Ottoman Caliph Abdulmejid II and his first wife, Şehsuvar Hanım and maternal granddaughter of the last Ottoman Sultan Mehmed VI and his first wife, Nazikeda Kadın. She was the daughter of Şehzade Ömer Faruk and his first wife and cousin Sabiha Sultan.

Early life
Neslişah Sultan was born on 2 February 1921 in Nişantaşi Palace, Constantinople. Her father was Şehzade Ömer Faruk, only son of Caliph Abdulmejid II and Şehsuvar Hanım. Her mother was Sabiha Sultan, youngest daughter of Sultan Mehmed VI and Nazikeda Kadın. She had two younger sisters, Hanzade Sultan, and Necla Sultan. Her birth was the final entry inscribed in the palace register of dynasty members, making her the last imperial member of the Ottoman family.

At the exile of the imperial family in March 1924, Neslişah and her family settled in Nice, France where she was educated. Here she spent her childhood and adolescence, before moving to Egypt in 1938, where she received a proposal from Egyptian prince Hassan Toussoun, and despite protests, she was engaged to him. However, later she broke off the engagement.

Marriage
In 1940, Prince Muhammad Abdel Moneim, son of Egypt's last khedive Abbas Hilmi II send a proposal to Neslişah, as he was willing to marry her. Neslişah didn't agree and relations between her and father got cold, following which she agreed. The marriage took place on 26 September 1940, and she was given the title Sahibat-al Sumuw Al-Amira Neslishah (Her Highness Princess Neslishah). Two years earlier, Abdel Moneim, heir to a US$50,000,000 fortune, had obtained permission from his second cousin King Farouk of Egypt to marry Princess Myzejen Zogu (1909–1969), sister of King Zog I of Albania. However, the marriage never took place and Prince Abdel Moneim married Neslişah instead. On 16 October 1941, she gave birth to Prince Abbas Hilmi. He was followed three years later by Princess Ikbal, born on 22 December 1944.

When the Egyptian Free Officers Movement deposed King Farouk in the July 1952 Revolution, they chose Prince Abdel Moneim to serve as chairman of the three-member Regency Body established to assume the powers of Farouk's newly enthroned infant son Fuad II. The Regency Body was dissolved on 7 September 1952, and Abdel Moneim was appointed as sole Prince regent. In the absence of a Queen consort, Neslişah de facto served as such by virtue of her position as the wife of the Prince regent. Her few official appearances during her husband's regency focused on charity work. Like the royal consorts who preceded her, she attended sporting events such as polo matches and the international tennis tournament final.

Prince Abdel Moneim's regency lasted ten months in all. The Egyptian Revolutionary Command Council formally abolished the monarchy on 18 June 1953. In 1957, Abdel Moneim and Neslişah were arrested. Again forced into exile, Neslişah was released from prison after the President of the Republic of Turkey intervened and demanded her release. She subsequently lived for a short time in Europe, then returned to her native Turkey. In 1963, she reclaimed Turkish citizenship, and took the surname Osmanoğlu. Prince Abdel Moneim died in 1979 in Istanbul, where Princess Neslişah continued to live with her unmarried daughter Ikbal.

Death
Neslişah died of heart attack on 2 April 2012 at her home in Ortaköy, attended by her daughter. At the time of her death, Neslişah was the most senior Ottoman princess. After the deaths of Prince Burhaneddin Cem in 2008 and Prince Ertuğrul Osman in 2009, she was also the last surviving member of the Ottoman dynasty to have been born during the Ottoman era. A funeral service was held for her in Yıldız Hamidiye Mosque. She was buried in Aşiyan Asri Cemetery, next to her mother and sisters. The then President Abdullah Gül presented a message of condolence to family members. Prime Minister Recep Tayyip Erdoğan praised the late princess. "She was the poster-child for nobleness who carried the blood of Osman," he said in Parliament, referring to Osman I, the Anatolian ruler who established the Ottoman Empire. "We remember her with high regard and our blessings."

Personality
A well cultured lady, Neslişah was fluent in French, English, German and Arabic and was also an avid skier, swimmer and equestrian. She was also interested in history, literature, geography, botany and the culture of cuisine. She was also highly respected by a number of significant conductors in the music world.

Honours
 Order of the House of Osman, 1922

Ancestry

See also
Sultans:Imperial Princesses

References

Sources

External links
 

1921 births
2012 deaths
Egyptian princesses
Muhammad Ali dynasty
20th-century Ottoman princesses
Turkish expatriates in France
Burials at Aşiyan Asri Cemetery